State Road 102 (SR 102), locally known as Airport Road, is a state highway in Jacksonville, Florida, connecting Interstate 95 with Jacksonville International Airport. State Road 243 runs south from SR 102, connecting to Interstate 295.

Route description
State Road 102 is the main road into Jacksonville International Airport. Many stores and hotels line SR 102's length between I-95 and the airport. SR 102 ends just east of I-95, near River City Marketplace.

Major intersections

References

102
102
102